Chapel Milton Viaduct is a Grade II listed bifurcated railway viaduct on the Great Rocks Line at its junction with the Hope Valley Line, straddling the Black Brook valley in Chapel Milton, Derbyshire, England. The first section of the viaduct, built by the Midland Railway in 1867, diverges and curves to the west while the second, built in 1890, curves to the east as the line, coming up from the south, links up with the main line between Sheffield and Manchester.

Originally built to carry express trains from London St Pancras to Manchester London Road, the viaduct now carries a freight-only line transporting limestone from the quarries and works around Buxton.

The viaduct is a significant and dominant structure within the small hamlet, which is largely characterised by its presence. It also passes over the Peak Forest Tramway, an early industrial railway operational from 1796. Since July 2019, an aerial shot of the double viaduct has featured in the opening titles of the regional news programme BBC North West Tonight.

Description

The viaduct has two curved arcades, converging to the south with fourteen arches to the east and fifteen to the west. The central arch of the western arcade is blocked with a blind venetian arch; it is filled with clay to help reduce vibration. It has tapering rectangular piers with a projecting string course at the top. All arches are stilted and voussoired, with a string course and parapet wall over, topped by projecting copings.

History

The Midland Railway opened a new line via Chapel-en-le-Frith Central and Great Rocks Dale, linking the Manchester, Buxton, Matlock and Midland Junction Railway with the Manchester, Sheffield and Lincolnshire Railway, in 1867, giving it an express through route for the first time between Manchester and London. The Midland's Engineer-in-Chief for the project was William Henry Barlow (known for designing the train shed at St Pancras at around the same time), and he designed, along with the rest of the structures on the line, the Chapel Milton Viaduct which curves to the west at the junction with the MS&LR. The fifteen-arch bridge was required to carry the railway across a deep valley formed by the Black Brook, which is a tributary of the River Goyt.

The stone was obtained from Black Edge Quarry, about two miles from the works. Some of the larger stones in the foundation were raised in Crist Quarry, Bugsworth. According to a contemporary report in The Engineer, the viaduct cost £15,000, given at the rate of 5s 3d per cubic yard; the contractors were Echerley and Bayliss of Victoria Street, Westminster.

The eastern section, essentially a second, mirror-image viaduct in an identical style, was added in 1890 to allow trains to travel between Sheffield and the south via Buxton and the Midland's own line.

The viaduct is recorded in the National Heritage List for England as a Grade II listed building, having been designated on 12 April 1984. Grade II is the lowest of the three grades of listing, and is applied to "buildings that are nationally important and of special interest".

A refurbishment of the western section was undertaken by the bridge's owner and maintainer Network Rail in 2017, with works including vegetation removal, repointing, localised stitch repair to cracks, and removal and replacement of localised areas of spalled brickwork.

References

External links

Midland Railway
Railway viaducts in Derbyshire
High Peak, Derbyshire
Bridges completed in 1867
Bridges completed in 1890